In Jainism cosmology, the Nigoda is a realm existing in which the lowest forms of invisible life reside in endless numbers, and without any hope of release by self-effort. Jain scriptures describe nigodas which are microorganisms living in large clusters, having only one sense, having a very short life and are said to pervade each and every part of universe, even in tissues of plants and flesh of animals. The Nigoda exists in contrast to the Supreme Abode, also located at the Siddhashila (top of the universe) where liberated souls exist in omnisciencent and eternal bliss. According to Jain tradition, it is said that when a human being achieves liberation (Moksha) or if a human would be born as a Nigoda due to karma, another from the Nigoda is given the potential of self-effort and hope.

Characteristics
The life in Nigoda is that of a sub-microscopic organism possessing only one sense, i.e., of touch.

Notes

References
 

Jain cosmology